Delijeh (also Romanized as Delījeh) is a village in Gorganbuy Rural District, in the Central District of Aqqala County, Golestan Province, Iran. At the 2006 census, its population was 919, in 170 families.

References 

Populated places in Aqqala County